The Diocese of Chester is a Church of England diocese in the Province of York covering the pre-1974 county of Cheshire and therefore including the Wirral and parts of Stockport, Trafford and Tameside.

History

Ancient diocese
Before the sixteenth century the city possessed a bishop and a cathedral, though only intermittently. Even before the Norman conquest the title "Bishop of Chester" is found in documents applied to prelates who would be more correctly described as Bishop of Mercia, or Bishop of Lichfield. After the Council of London in 1075 had decreed the transfer of all episcopal chairs to cities, Peter, Bishop of Lichfield, removed his seat from Lichfield to Chester, and became known as Bishop of Chester. There he chose The Collegiate Church of St John the Baptist as his cathedral. The next bishop, however, transferred (1102) the see to Coventry on account of the rich monastery there, though he retained the episcopal palace at Chester. The Diocese of Coventry and Lichfield was of enormous extent, and it was probably found convenient to have something analogous to a cathedral at Chester, even though the cathedra itself were elsewhere; accordingly the church of St John ranked as a cathedral for a considerable time, and had its own dean and chapter of secular canons down to the time of the Reformation.

The chief ecclesiastical foundation in Chester was the Benedictine monastery of St Werburgh, the great church of which finally became the Cathedral Church of Christ and the Blessed Virgin Mary. The site had been occupied even during the Christian period of the Roman occupation by a church dedicated to Saints Peter and Paul, and rededicated to St Werburgh and St Oswald during the Saxon period. The church was served by a small chapter of secular canons until 1093, when Hugh Lupus, Earl of Chester, converted it into a major Benedictine monastery, in which foundation he had the co-operation of St Anselm, then Prior of Bec, who sent Richard, one of his monks, to be the first abbot. A new Norman church was built by him and his successors. The monastery, though suffering loss of property both by the depredations of the Welsh and the inroads of the sea, prospered, and in the thirteenth, fourteenth, and fifteenth centuries the monks transformed their Norman church into a gothic building which, though not be reckoned among the greatest cathedrals of England, yet is not unworthy of its rank, and affords a valuable study in the evolution of Gothic architecture. It has been said of it that "at every turn it is satisfying in small particulars and disappointing in great features". The last of the abbots was John, or Thomas, Clark, who resigned his abbey, valued at £1,003 5s. 11d. per annum, to the king.

1541 to 1836
The diocese was created, during the Reformation, on 14 August 1541 from the Chester archdeaconry of the Diocese of Lichfield and Coventry, covering Cheshire and Lancashire, and the Richmond Archdeaconry of the Diocese of York. The diocese was originally formed as part of the Province of Canterbury, but was quickly transferred to the Province of York later in the same year. The twenty deaneries of the new diocese were: Amounderness, Bangor, Blackburn, Boroughbridge, Catterick, Chester, Copeland, Frodsham, Furness, Kendal, Leyland, Lonsdale, Macclesfield, Malpas, Manchester, Middlewich, Nantwich, Richmond, Warrington, and Wirral. The deaneries as shown in the accompanying map, were established by 1224 and remained largely unchanged until the nineteenth century.

Since 1836
Starting in 1836, a series of boundary changes saw the diocese eventually greatly diminished in size so that its extent was almost the same as that of the ceremonial county of Cheshire as it existed just prior to 1974. A sequence of five major boundary changes to the diocese began. In 1836, the deaneries of Boroughbridge, Catterick, and Richmond, and half of the deanery of Lonsdale were taken from Chester to form part of the newly created Diocese of Ripon which also had parts taken from the Diocese of York. In 1847, the deaneries of Amounderness, Blackburn, Leyland, and Manchester, together with another large part of the deanery of Lonsdale and roughly one third of the deanery of Kendal were taken to form the then new Diocese of Manchester. Additionally, part of the deanery of Warrington (Leigh) was also transferred to this new Diocese of Manchester. At the same time, the deanery of Bangor was transferred to the Diocese of St Asaph. This left the deaneries of Copeland, Furness, and the remaining parts of the deaneries of Kendal and Lonsdale detached from the main part of the diocese around Chester, provision was made to transfer these to the Diocese of Carlisle, but this required the assent of the then Bishop of Carlisle, or the appointment of a successor. In 1849, the part of the deanery of Chester that extended into Wales was transferred to the Diocese of St Asaph. The detached deaneries in the north of Lancashire and in the Lake District were eventually transferred to the Diocese of Carlisle in 1856, on the appointment of Henry Montagu Villiers to the See. Finally, in 1880, the remaining part of the deanery of Warrington was used to create the new Diocese of Liverpool. At that point, the Diocese of Chester had been reduced to its present size.

Present day
The Bishop of Chester is assisted by two suffragan bishops, the Bishop of Stockport and the Bishop of Birkenhead. The suffragan See of Stockport was created in 1949 and was the sole suffragan bishopric in the diocese until the See of Birkenhead was created in 1965. Since 1994 the Bishop of Beverley (currently the Right Reverend Glyn Webster, consecrated in 2013) has provided "alternative episcopal oversight" in this diocese (among eleven others in the Province of York) to those parishes which cannot in conscience accept the sacramental ministry of bishops who have participated in the ordination of women.

There are two archdeaconries, Chester and Macclesfield, which are further divided into 18 deaneries. There are consequently two archdeacons: the Archdeacon of Chester, the Venerable Michael Gilbertson, and the Archdeacon of Macclesfield, the Venerable Ian Bishop. There is also the Dean of Chester, currently the Very Reverend Tim Stratford, who is primarily responsible for the running of the cathedral.

Bishops
The diocesan Bishop of Chester Mark Tanner is supported by two suffragan bishops: the Bishop suffragan of Birkenhead (Julie Conalty) and the Bishop suffragan of Stockport (Sam Corley). Alternative episcopal oversight (for parishes in the diocese which do not accept ordination of women as priests) is provided by the provincial episcopal visitor (PEV) the Bishop suffragan of Beverley, Glyn Webster. He is licensed as an honorary assistant bishop in the diocese. Besides Webster, there are five retired honorary assistant bishops licensed in the diocese:

1997–present: Willie Pwaisiho, a former Bishop of Malaita, is now Rector of Gawsworth.
2000–present: Colin Bazley, retired Bishop of Chile, lives in Higher Bebington
2002–present: Geoffrey Turner is a former Bishop suffragan of Stockport who lives in West Kirby
2008–present: John Hayden was an assistant bishop for Kiteto in the Diocese of Mount Kilimanjaro; he now lives in Hoylake
2009–present: Graham Dow, a retired Bishop of Carlisle, lives in Romiley and is also licensed as an honorary assistant bishop in the neighbouring Diocese of Manchester

See also

 Bishoprics of Chester and Man Act 1541

References

Notes

Bibliography

 
1541 establishments in England
Dioceses established in the 16th century
Chester
Religion in Cheshire
Religious organizations established in the 1540s